Random Hearts is a 1999 American romantic drama film directed by Sydney Pollack and starring Harrison Ford and Kristin Scott Thomas. Based on the 1984 novel of the same name by Warren Adler, the film is about a police officer and a Congresswoman who discover that their spouses were having an affair prior to being killed in an air disaster.

Plot
Sergeant William "Dutch" Van Den Broeck is a police sergeant in the Internal Affairs Division of the Washington, D.C. Metropolitan Police Department, working on a case involving a crooked detective. He is married to a fashion editor. Kay Chandler is a Congresswoman running for re-election. She is married to a lawyer and has a teenage daughter.

A Boeing 737-300 bound for Miami crashes, and everyone on board is killed. Dutch realizes that his wife was on the plane, but the airline has no record of her. He believes that she was registered under another name and was having an affair, and he finds out that she was sitting next to Kay's husband. Wanting to learn more about the affair, he meets with Kay. Concerned about the publicity, she is not willing to talk and tells him to leave her alone.

Dutch goes to Miami and visits the hotel that his wife was planning to go to. Kay, who has changed her mind, meets with him there. They talk more about the situation. After flying back home, they kiss in her car. Dutch goes to a campaign fundraiser for Kay and convinces her to not drop out of the race.

Dutch invites Kay to his cabin near Chesapeake Bay. She visits him, and they have sex. He still wants to know more about the affair and believes that their two spouses had an apartment together, but Kay tells him that they should forget about the past and move on with their lives.

Stressed, Dutch is suspended from his job after assaulting a suspect. He and Kay each find out about the apartment separately. When Dutch goes to visit the apartment, he finds Kay already there cleaning everything out. She leaves, and he chases her into the street, where he is shot by the suspect in his case. He lives, and the suspect is caught.

With rumors about their relationship growing, Kay publicly confirms that she and Dutch are friends. Dutch soon gets promoted to lieutenant, and Kay loses her bid for re-election. As she is leaving Washington, Dutch meets her at the airport. They are happy to see each other, and he asks if he can take her out on a date sometime.

Cast

Production
The film was stuck in development hell for 15 years before finally being made. In the 1980s, actor Dustin Hoffman met with the book's author with a view to making the film. Although Hoffman prompted CBS Theatrical Films to acquire the rights with a view to his starring in the film, he rejected several drafts of the script before leaving the project altogether. In the early 1990s, Kevin Costner was attached to star in the project, which was then to be directed by James L. Brooks, though this, too, never came to pass. The crash of the Boeing 737 was inspired by the crash of Air Florida Flight 90, a Boeing 737-200 that took off from Ronald Reagan Washington National Airport with destination to Tampa Bay, Florida.

Reception

Critical response
Random Hearts was poorly received by critics. Review aggregation website Rotten Tomatoes retrospectively gives the film a rating of 15% based on reviews collected from 87 critics. The site's consensus states: "Even Harrison Ford could not save the dull plot and the slow pacing of the movie." Metacritic calculated an average score of 38 out of 100, based on 35 reviews. Audiences polled by CinemaScore gave the film an average grade of "C-" on an A+ to F scale.

In a positive review from The New York Times, Janet Maslin wrote that the films of Sydney Pollack "have managed to be linear while also drifting thoughtfully through the nuances of their characters' behavior, with a stylistic polish and keenness of observation not often found in American films any more." Maslin also noted that "laconic Ford is wrenchingly effective throughout."

In the Chicago Sun-Times, Roger Ebert wrote, "There are so many good things in Random Hearts, but they're side by side instead of one after the other. They exist in the same film, but they don't add up to the result of the film. Actually, the film has no result—just an ending, leaving us with all of those fine pieces, still waiting to come together. If this were a screenplay and not the final product, you could see how with one more rewrite, it might all fall into place."

Box office
With an estimated budget of $64,000,000, Random Hearts was not a commercial success domestically, earning $31,502,583 in the United States and Canada. The film went on to earn another $43,105,987 in international markets, ending up with a total worldwide gross of $74,608,570.

References

External links

 
 
 

1999 films
1999 romantic drama films
American romantic drama films
Columbia Pictures films
Films directed by Sydney Pollack
Films scored by Dave Grusin
Films based on American novels
Films based on romance novels
Films shot in Baltimore
Films shot in Florida
Films shot in New Jersey
Films shot in New York (state)
Films shot in Virginia
Films shot in Washington, D.C.
1990s English-language films
1990s American films